Villarino may refer to:

Basilio Villarino, Spanish Royal Navy captain, explorer and writer
Xulio Villarino (born 1969), Spanish photographer
Ahigal de Villarino, village and municipality in Salamanca, Spain
Villarino de los Aires, municipality in Salamanca, Spain
Villarino Partido, partido in Buenos Aires Province, Argentina named after the explorer
ARA Villarino, 1880s Argentine Navy steamer named after the explorer
Basilio Villarino Bridge, named after the explorer, connecting the Argentinian cities of Viedma and Carmen de Patagones
Villarino Lake, named after the explorer, in the province of Neuquen, Argentina
Villarino River, connecting Villarino lake with Falkner lake, also in Neuquen, Argentina